Alan Thomas Devlin (born 10 October 1953) is a Scottish former footballer who played as a forward for Dundee United, Exeter City and Broxburn Athletic.

Early life
Devlin was born in Edinburgh on 10 October 1953. He played youth football for Tynecastle Boys Club.

Career
Devlin initially joined Dundee United as a schoolboy signing. He turned professional in October 1969 and became a regular in the reserve team, going on to make over fifty appearances at that level. He made his first team debut as a substitute against Morton on 9 January 1971, scoring a goal in United's 3–2 defeat. He made his first starting appearance the following week, but was unable to establish himself as a first team regular, going on to score four goals in a total of twelve appearances. He accepted the offer of a free transfer in September 1972.

Devlin signed for Exeter City in November 1973, making one Football League appearance for the club. He later played junior football in Scotland for Broxburn Athletic.

References

External links

1953 births
Living people
Footballers from Edinburgh
Scottish footballers
Association football forwards
Tynecastle F.C. players
Dundee United F.C. players
Exeter City F.C. players
Broxburn Athletic F.C. players
Scottish Football League players
English Football League players
Scottish Junior Football Association players